Kenton County Golf Course is located at 3908 Richardson Road, Independence, KY 41051 and offers a 54-hole facility. All three of the courses offer low handicappers, as well as the average golfer challenging and fun layouts. The Pioneer is the shortest of the courses playing to a par 71. As the name indicates, it was the first course built at the complex in 1968. The Pioneer course is 5,880 yards with a rating of 68.4, a slope of 115. It is like most mid-western courses, slightly sloping on the front nine with increasing slopes on the back. Easily the most walkable course at the complex. Power carts are optional and they may be taken across the fairway at 90 degrees. The Willows, designed by Dr. Michael Hurdzan, offers golfers a scenic and challenging test of tree-lined fairways and undulating greens. The Willows course plays to 6,697 yards from the championship tees, rated 9th in Kentucky. Par 72, and the course rating is 72.6 and the slope is 137. The Willows is a real challenge of golf, for any level player. Power carts are optional, and are permitted to cross at 90 degrees. Fox Run, another masterpiece by renowned architect Arthur Hills, this distinctively different golf course provides a wonderful blend of architectural style from hole to hole. Here you will find links-type holes which somewhat resemble that of a Scottish golf course. There is a sampling of Carolina-type holes with drastic changes in elevation from tee to green. Finally, there is a balance of more traditional mid-western style golf holes: all of which gracefully blend with the natural terrain and surrounding environment. The absence of housing and condo developments within the course allows the golfer to truly experience nature in its spectacular beauty. This course is consistently rated one of the most challenging public courses in the State of Kentucky.
Kenton County Golf Course also has a driving range and a clubhouse with a pro-shop, a bar, and a wide variety of food.

Billy Casper Golf was named as the new management company for the golf courses in December 2019 

.

References

Golf clubs and courses in Kentucky